The PAE Living Building is a commercial building in Portland, Oregon.

Located at Southwest 1st Avenue and Pine Street, the five-story "living building" was designed by ZGF Architects.

References

2022 establishments in Oregon
Buildings and structures in Portland, Oregon
Commercial buildings completed in 2022
Old Town Chinatown
Southwest Portland, Oregon